During the fifth term (1999–2004), there were 626 members of parliament divided among the 15 member states. As part of the 2004 enlargement, the national parliaments of the 10 new member states sent a total of 162 observers to the European Parliament from April 2003. On 1 May 2004, upon the countries' accession, the observers became MEPs until the start of the next term (20 July 2004) elected in the June 2004 elections.

List (by country)

B
Emmanouil Bakopoulos
Richard Balfe
Alexandros Baltas
Mary Banotti
Enrique Barón Crespo
Paolo Bartolozzi
Regina Bastos
Juan Bayona de Perogordo
Christopher Beazley
Jean-Pierre Bebear
Bastiaan Belder
Rolf Berend
Luis Berenguer Fuster
Pervenche Berès
Margrietus van den Berg
María Bergaz Conesa
Maria Berger
Sergio Berlato
Jean-Louis Bernié
Georges Berthu
Fausto Bertinotti
Ward Beysen
Roberto Bigliardo
Freddy Blak
Johannes Blokland
Guido Bodrato
Reimer Böge
Herbert Bösch
Christian von Boetticher
Jens-Peter Bonde
Emma Bonino
Johanna Boogerd-Quaak
Graham Booth
Armonia Bordes
Mario Borghezio
Bob van den Bos
Enrico Boselli
Yasmine Boudjenah
Alima Boumediene-Thiery
Jean-Louis Bourlanges
Theodorus Bouwman
David Bowe
John Bowis
Philip Bradbourn
Cees Bremmer
Hiltrud Breyer
André Brie
Giuseppe Brienza
Elmar Brok
Renato Brunetta
Kathalijne Buitenweg
Hans Bullmann
Ieke van den Burg
Philip Bushill-Matthews
Niels Busk
Yves Butel

C
Martin Callanan
Giorgio Calò
Felipe Camisón Asensio
António Campos
Mogens Camre
Carlos Candal
Marco Cappato
Raquel Cardoso
Marie-Arlette Carlotti
Carlos Carnero González
Massimo Carraro
Maria Carrilho
Paulo Casaca
Michael Cashman
Gérard Caudron
Isabelle Caullery
Chantal Cauquil
Charlotte Cederschiöld
Giorgio Celli
Alejandro Cercas
Carmen Cerdeira Morterero
Luigi Cesaro
Ozan Ceyhun
Giles Chichester
Philip Claeys
Nicholas Clegg
Luigi Cocilovo
Carlos Coelho
Daniel Cohn-Bendit
Gerry Collins
Joan Colom i Naval
Richard Corbett
Dorette Corbey
Thierry Cornillet
John Corrie
Armando Cossutta
Paolo Costa
Raffaele Costa
Paul Coûteaux
Pat Cox
Brian Crowley
John Cushnahan

D
Rijk van Dam
Elisa Damião
Danielle Darras
Michel Dary
Joseph Daul
Chris Davies
Willy De Clercq
Francis Decourrière
Jean-Maurice Dehousse
Véronique De Keyser
Gianfranco Dell'Alba
Benedetto Della Vedova
Marcello Dell'Utri
Luigi De Mita
Gérard Deprez
Proinsias De Rossa
Marielle De Sarnez
Marie-Hélène Descamps
Harlem Désir
Nirj Deva
Christine De Veyrac
Jan Dhaene
Rosa Díez González
Giuseppe Di Lello Finuoli
Koenraad Dillen
Giorgos Dimitrakopoulos
Antonio Di Pietro
Bert Doorn
Den Dover
Avril Doyle
Bárbara Dührkop Dührkop
Andrew Duff
Olivier Duhamel
Garrelt Duin
Olivier Dupuis
Lone Dybkjær

E
Michl Ebner
Raina Echerer
Petros Efthymiou
Säid El Khadraoui
James Elles
Marianne Eriksson
Alain Esclopé
Harald Ettl
Jillian Evans
Jonathan Evans
Robert Evans

F
Göran Färm
Nigel Farage
Carlo Fatuzzo
Giovanni Fava
Markus Ferber
Fernando Fernández Martín
Juan Ferrández Lezaun
Anne Ferreira
Concepció Ferrer
Enrico Ferri
Christel Fiebiger
Ilda Figueiredo
Francesco Fiori
Jim Fitzsimons
Hélène Flautre
Marialiese Flemming
Colette Flesch
Karl-Heinz Florenz
Christos Folias
Glyn Ford
Marco Formentini
Jacqueline Foster
Janelly Fourtou
Pernille Frahm
Geneviève Fraisse
Monica Frassoni
Ingo Friedrich
Jean-Claude Fruteau

G
Michael Gahler
Per Gahrton
Gerardo Galeote Quecedo
Marie-Françoise Garaud
José García-Margallo y Marfil
Cristina García-Orcoyen Tormo
Giuseppe Gargani
Georges Garot
Salvador Garriga Polledo
Carles-Alfred Gasòliba i Böhm
Charles de Gaulle
Jas Gawronski
Evelyne Gebhardt
Vitaliano Gemelli
Fiorella Ghilardotti
Neena Gill
Marie-Hélène Gillig
José Gil-Robles Gil-Delgado
Norbert Glante
Anne-Karin Glase
Gian Gobbo
Robert Goebbels
Lutz Goepel
Willi Görlach
Bruno Gollnisch
Alfred Gomolka
Robert Goodwill
Koldo Gorostiaga Atxalandabaso
João Gouveia
Friedrich-Wilhelm Graefe zu Baringdorf
Vasco Graça Moura
Pauline Green (resigned November 1999)
Lissy Gröner
Lisbeth Grönfeldt Bergman
Mathieu Grosch
Françoise Grossetête
Cristina Gutiérrez-Cortines
Catherine Guy-Quint

H
Klaus Hänsch
Gerhard Hager
Daniel Hannan
Michel Hansenne
Malcolm Harbour
Konstantinos Hatzidakis
Jutta Haug
Adeline Hazan
Christopher Heaton-Harris
Ewa Hedkvist Petersen
Roger Helmer
Marie-Thérèse Hermange
Jorge Hernández Mollar
María Herranz García
Philippe Herzog
Ruth Hieronymi
Magdalene Hoff
Mary Honeyball (from 2000)
Brice Hortefeux
Richard Howitt
Ian Hudghton
Stephen Hughes
Christopher Huhne
Michiel van Hulten
John Hume
Liam Hyland

I
Ulpu Iivari
Wolfgang Ilgenfritz
Renzo Imbeni
Lord Inglewood
Marie Isler Béguin
Juan Izquierdo Collado
María Izquierdo Rojo

J
Caroline Jackson
Georg Jarzembowski
Thierry Jean-Pierre
Elisabeth Jeggle
Anne Jensen
Karin Jöns
Pierre Jonckheer
Salvador Jové Peres
Karin Junker

K
Anna Karamanou
Othmar Karas
Hans Karlsson
Martin Kastler
Giorgos Katiforis
Sylvia-Yvonne Kaufmann
Piia-Noora Kauppi
Hedwig Keppelhoff-Wiechert
Margot Kessler
Bashir Khanbhai
Heinz Kindermann
Glenys Kinnock
Timothy Kirkhope
Ewa Klamt
Christa Klaß
Karsten Knolle
Dieter-Lebrecht Koch
Christoph Konrad
Efstratios Korakas
Eija-Riitta Korhola
Ioannis Koukiadis
Dimitrios Koulourianos
Ole Krarup
Rodi Kratsa-Tsagaropoulou
Constanze Krehl
Wolfgang Kreissl-Dörfler
Alain Krivine
Hans Kronberger
Wilfried Kuckelkorn
Helmut Kuhne
Florence Kuntz

L
Carlos Lage
Joost Lagendijk
Arlette Laguiller
Catherine Lalumière
Alain Lamassoure
Jean Lambert
Carl Lang
Bernd Lange
Werner Langen
Brigitte Langenhagen
Paul Lannoye
Thierry de La Perriere
Armin Laschet
Vincenzo Lavarra
Kurt Lechner
Klaus-Heiner Lehne
Jo Leinen
Peter Liese
Rolf Linkohr
Alain Lipietz
Giorgio Lisi
Raffaele Lombardo
Caroline Lucas
Sarah Ludford
Astrid Lulling
Torben Lund
Elizabeth Lynne

M
Albert Maat
Jules Maaten
Linda McAvan
Arlene McCarthy
Joe McCartin
Neil MacCormick
Patricia McKenna
Edward McMillan-Scott
Eryl McNally
Nelly Maes
Minerva Malliori
Cecilia Malmström
Toine Manders
Lucio Manisco
Erika Mann
Thomas Mann
Mario Mantovani
Jean-Charles Marchiani
Luís Marinho
Franco Marini
Ioannis Marinos
Helmuth Markov
Sérgio Marques
Pedro Marset Campos
Claudio Martelli
Maria Martens
David Martin
Hans-Peter Martin
Hugues Martin
Jean-Claude Martinez
Miguel Martínez Martínez
Mario Mastella
Emmanouil Mastorakis
Véronique Mathieu
Marjo Matikainen-Kallström
Mario Mauro
Hans-Peter Mayer
Xaver Mayer
Miquel Mayol i Raynal
Manuel Medina Ortega
Erik Meijer
Íñigo Méndez de Vigo
José Mendiluce Pereiro
Emilio Menéndez del Valle
Pietro-Paolo Mennea
Domenico Mennitti
Winfried Menrad
Reinhold Messner
Rosa Miguélez Ramos
Bill Miller
Joaquim Miranda
Ana Miranda De Lage
Hans Modrow
Peter Mombaur
Enrique Monsonís Domingo
Elizabeth Montfort
Claude Moraes
Eluned Morgan
Luisa Morgantini
Philippe Morillon
Rosemarie Müller
Jan Mulder
Simon Murphy
Cristiana Muscardini
Francesco Musotto
Antonio Mussa
Sebastiano Musumeci
Riitta Myller

N
Sami Naïr
Pasqualina Napoletano
Giorgio Napolitano
Juan Naranjo Escobar
Hartmut Nassauer
Bill Newton Dunn
Jim Nicholson
Baroness Nicholson of Winterbourne
Angelika Niebler
Giuseppe Nistico'
Mauro Nobilia
Camilo Nogueira Román
Jean-Thomas Nordmann

O
Raimon Obiols
Juan Ojeda Sanz
Karl Olsson
Seán Ó Neachtain
Gérard Onesta
Ria Oomen-Ruijten
Arie Oostlander
Marcelino Oreja Arburúa
Josu Ortuondo Larrea
Barbara O'Toole

P
Reino Paasilinna
José Pacheco Pereira
Elena Paciotti
Doris Pack
Ian Paisley
Marco Pannella
Mihalis Papagiannakis
Neil Parish
Charles Pasqua
Paolo Pastorelli
Ioannis Patakis
Béatrice Patrie
Marit Paulsen
Manuel Pérez Álvarez
Fernando Pérez Royo
Roy Perry
Mikko Pesälä
Peter Pex
Wilhelm Piecyk
Yves Piétrasanta
Hubert Pirker
Joaquim Piscarreta
Giuseppe Pisicchio
Giovanni Pittella
Elly Plooij-Van Gorsel
Guido Podestà
Hans-Gert Poettering
Samuli Pohjamo
Bernard Poignant
Adriana Poli Bortone
José Pomés Ruiz
Jacques Poos
Bernd Posselt
Christa Prets
Giovanni Procacci
Bartho Pronk
James Provan
Alonso Puerta
John Purvis

Q
Luís Queiró
Godelieve Quisthoudt-Rowohl

R
Reinhard Rack
Alexander Radwan
Christa Randzio-Plath
Bernhard Rapkay
Daniela Raschhofer
Michel Raymond
Imelda Read
Encarnación Redondo Jiménez
José Ribeiro e Castro
Mónica Ridruejo
Frédérique Ries
Karin Riis-Jørgensen
Carlos Ripoll Y Martínez De Bedoya
Michel Rocard
Didier Rod
María Rodríguez Ramos
Alexander de Roo
Dagmar Roth-Behrendt
Mechtild Rothe
Willi Rothley
Martine Roure
Christian Rovsing
Paul Rübig
Heide Rühle
Giorgio Ruffolo
Francesco Rutelli

S
Guido Sacconi
Lennart Sacrédeus
Jean Saint-Josse
Jannis Sakellariou
José Salafranca Sánchez-Neyra
Yvonne Sandberg-Fries
Ulla Sandbæk
Maria Sanders-Ten Holte
Jacques Santer
Giacomo Santini
Manuel dos Santos
Amalia Sartori
Francisca Sauquillo Pérez del Arco
Gilles Savary
Luciana Sbarbati
Dana Scallon
Umberto Scapagnini
Michel-Ange Scarbonchi
Anne-Marie Schaffner
Karin Scheele
Agnes Schierhuber
Ursula Schleicher
Gerhard Schmid
Herman Schmid
Olle Schmidt
Ingo Schmitt
Horst Schnellhardt
Inger Schörling
Ilka Schröder
Jürgen Schröder
Elisabeth Schroedter
Martin Schulz
Konrad Schwaiger
Mariotto Segni
Esko Seppänen
Peter Sichrovsky
Brian Simpson
Jonas Sjöstedt
Peter Skinner
Miet Smet
Mário Soares
Patsy Sörensen
Renate Sommer
María Sornosa Martínez
Dominique Souchet
Ioannis Souladakis
Sérgio Sousa Pinto
Francesco Speroni
Bart Staes
Gabriele Stauner
Per Stenmarck
Ursula Stenzel
Dirk Sterckx
Struan Stevenson
Catherine Stihler
Marie-France Stirbois
Ulrich Stockmann
Earl of Stockton
Robert Sturdy
Margie Sudre
David Sumberg
Ilkka Suominen
Joke Swiebel
Johannes Swoboda
Fodé Sylla
Ole Sørensen

T
Antonio Tajani
Charles Tannock
Anna Terrón i Cusí
Diemut Theato
Maj Theorin
Nicole Thomas-Mauro
Helle Thorning-Schmidt
Astrid Thors
Marianne Thyssen
Jeffrey Titford
Gary Titley
Helena Torres Marques
Antonios Trakatellis
Bruno Trentin
Dimitris Tsatsos
Franz Turchi
Maurizio Turco
Claude Turmes
Ian Twinn

U
Feleknas Uca

V
Roseline Vachetta
Paavo Väyrynen
Joaquim Vairinhos
Jaime Valdivielso De Cué
María Valenciano Martínez-Orozco
Joan Vallvé
Johan Van Hecke
Anne Van Lancker
Geoffrey Van Orden
Alexandre Varaut
Daniel Varela Suanzes-Carpegna
Ari Vatanen
Gianni Vattimo
Walter Veltroni
W.G. van Velzen
Herman Vermeer
Françoise de Veyrinas
Alejo Vidal-Quadras Roca
Theresa Villiers
Luigi Vinci
Kyösti Virrankoski
Dominique Vlasto
Johannes Voggenhuber
Demetrio Volcic

W
Peder Wachtmeister
Diana Wallis
Ralf Walter
Graham Watson
Mark Watts
Barbara Weiler
Brigitte Wenzel-Perillo
Phillip Whitehead
Rainer Wieland
Jan Wiersma
Anders Wijkman
Karl von Wogau
Joachim Wuermeling
Matti Wuori
Francis Wurtz
Eurig Wyn
Terence Wynn

X
Stavros Xarchakos

Z
Theresa Zabell
Christos Zacharakis
Stefano Zappala'
François Zimeray
Jürgen Zimmerling
Sabine Zissener
Myrsini Zorba
Olga Zrihen

See also
 Members of the European Parliament 1999–2004
 1999 European Parliament election

References

List